Mauricio de María y Campos (13 October 1943 – 24 May 2021) was a Director-General of the United Nations Industrial Development Organization (UNIDO) and former Mexican Ambassador to South Africa.

Personal life
Mauricio de María y Campos was born in Mexico City.  He obtained a BA Degree in Economics at the National Autonomous University of Mexico (UNAM) and a master's degree of Arts in Economic Development at Sussex University.

He died in his home in Mexico City on 24 May 2021.

Career
 Undersecretary for Industrial Development at the Ministry for Trade and Industrial Development (1989–1992)
 Director General of the United Nations Industrial Development Organization (UNIDO) (1993–1997)
 Ambassador at Large for Special UN Projects and Advisor to the Undersecretary for United Nations, Africa and Middle Eastern Affairs (Ministry of Foreign Affairs of Mexico, 1998–2001)
 Mexican Ambassador to South Africa (March 2002 – 2007)
 Director of the Instituto de Investigaciones sobre Desarrollo Sustentable y Equidad Social de la Universidad Iberoamericana (2013?)
 President of the Centro Tepoztlán (2014–2018)
 Member of the Instituto para el Desarrollo Industrial y el Crecimiento Económico (IDIC)
 Associate Researcher at the Center for Economic Studies (CEE) of El Colegio de México
 Columnist at El Financiero

References

1943 births
2021 deaths
United Nations Industrial Development Organization people
Mexican officials of the United Nations
Ambassadors of Mexico to South Africa
People from Mexico City